Caprus or Kapros, was a town of Chalcidice, in ancient Macedonia. It was the port of Stagira to the southwest of the Strymonian Gulf.

The site of Caprus is near the modern Olympias.

References

Populated places in ancient Macedonia
Former populated places in Greece
Geography of ancient Chalcidice